Blue Highway may refer to:
Blue Highway, an American contemporary bluegrass band
 Blue Highway (tourist route), an international tourist route from Norway to Russia via Sweden and Finland
"Blue Highway" (song), a song by John Conlee
"Blue Highway", a song by Tony Carey from his 1985 album also named Blue Highway
"Blue Highway", a song by Heatmiser from their 1996 album Mic City Sons
"Blue Highway", a song by Billy Idol from his 1983 album Rebel Yell
"Blue Highway", a song by George Thorogood from his 1982 album Bad to the Bone
Blue Highways, a book by William Least Heat-Moon
Blue Ridge Parkway, sometimes called the Blue Highway, a National Parkway and All-American Road in the United States